Noël Mathieu (3 May 1916, Gan, Pyrénées-Atlantiques – 22 September 1984, Paris) better known under his pseudonym Pierre Emmanuel, was a French poet of Christian inspiration.

Biography
He was the third member elected to occupy seat 4 of the Académie française in 1968, president of PEN International between 1969 and 1971, president of French PEN Club between 1973 and 1976, and the first president of the French Institut national de l'audiovisuel in 1975.

His second wife, née Janine Loo (daughter of C. T. Loo), died on April 23, 2013 at the age of 92. She is buried, with Pierre Emmanuel, in the Père-Lachaise cemetery (57th division).

Académie française
Pierre Emmanuel was elected to the Académie française (French Academy) on April 25, 1968,  succeeding Marshal Juin. His official reception took place on June 5, 1969. After the election of Félicien Marceau, whose collaborationist attitude he denounced, he resigned from the Academy in 1975 and ceased to sit. His colleagues, however, refused to take note of this decision by respectfully waiting until his death to replace him with the election of Professor Jean Hamburger on April 18, 1985.

Works
Each year links to its corresponding "[year] in poetry" article (for poetry) or "[year] in literature" article (for prose):

Poetry

 1940: Elégies
 1941: Tombeau d'Orphée
 1942: Le Poète et son Christ
 1943: Jour de colère ("Day of Wrath"), including "Hymne de la liberté" ("Hymn to Freedom")
 1943: "Les dents serrées", published in L’Honneur des poètes anthology, Éditions de Minuit
 1943: La Colombe
 1944: Le Poète fou ("The Mad Poet")
 1944: Mémento des vivants
 1944: Sodome
 1945: Combats avec tes défenseurs
 1945: La liberté guide nos pas
 1947: Poésie, raison ardente
 1947: Qui est cet homme
 1949: Car enfin je vous aime
 1952: Babel
 1956: Visage Nuage
 1958: Versant de l'Âge
 1961: Evangéliaire
 1963: Le Goût de l'un
 1963: La Nouvelle Naissance
 1965: La Face Humaine
 1970: Jacob
 1973: Sophia
 1976: La Vie Terrestre
 1978: Tu
 Le Livre de l'Homme et de la Femme, a trilogy:
 1978: Una ou la mort la vie
 1979: Duel
 1980: L’Autre 
 1981: L'Arbre et le Vent
 1981: Le grand oeuvre, published a few weeks before his death
 1984: Le grand œuvre. Une cosmogonie

Posthumously published
 2001: Tombeau d'Orphée suivi de Hymnes orphiques, édition établie et préfacée par Anne-Sophie Andreu, Lausanne, L'Âge d'homme, coll. Amers, 2001.
 2001: Œuvres poétiques complètes, Lausanne, L'Âge d'homme, 2001, t. I, 1940-1963.
 2003: Œuvres poétiques complètes, Lausanne, L'Âge d'homme, 2003, t. II, 1970-1984.
 2005: Lettres à Albert Béguin : correspondance 1941-1952 (édition établie et annotée par Aude Préta-de Beaufort). Lausanne, Paris : L'Âge d'homme, coll. « Cahiers Pierre Emmanuel » n° 2, 2005. .

Prose
 1950: The Universal Singular: The Autobiography of Pierre Emmanuel (trans. Erik de Mauny), Grey Walls Press: London. 
 1967: Le monde est intérieur ("The World is Inside")

Interviews 
 « Les dernières interrogations de Pierre Emmanuel » Emmanuel's final interview conducted by Damian Pettigrew, published in Le Monde, 7 October 1984

References

External links
 Pierre Emmanuel - The official site of Pierre Emmanuel
 PEN International

1916 births
1984 deaths
People from Béarn
Members of the Académie Française
Officiers of the Légion d'honneur
Commandeurs of the Ordre des Arts et des Lettres
Grand Officers of the Ordre national du Mérite
20th-century French poets
French male poets
20th-century French male writers
Congress for Cultural Freedom